John James Scannell was a publisher of biographies that was established in 1917 from Paterson, New Jersey, United States.

Book publishing companies based in New Jersey
Publishing companies established in 1917